The Naval Operations Branch is a personnel branch of the Canadian Forces. The branch consists of most of the seagoing occupations and trades of the Royal Canadian Navy.

Members of the branch wear an embroidered cap badge usually featuring a fouled anchor, though the exact badge depends on the wearer's rank and position.

Training

Naval Officers Training Centre (NOTC)
HMCS Venture, the Naval Officers Training Centre (NOTC), is located at Work Point in CFB Esquimalt, in Esquimalt, British Columbia. The role of the NOTC is to encompass all aspects of junior naval officer training and development.

Order of precedence

 
Note: When parading with their guns, the honour of "The Right of the Line" (precedence over other  Army units) is held by the units of the Royal Canadian Horse Artillery; otherwise, the Naval Operations Branch is succeeded immediately by formed bodies of Officer Cadets of the Royal Military College of Canada representing their college.

References

Canadian Armed Forces personnel branches
Canadian Armed Forces
Military history of Canada